John Heinrich Detlef Rabe (23 November 1882 – 5 January 1950) was a German businessman and Nazi Party member best known for his efforts to stop war crimes during the Japanese Nanjing Massacre (also known as Nanking) and his work to protect and help Chinese civilians during the massacre that ensued. The Nanking Safety Zone, which he helped to establish, sheltered approximately 250,000 Chinese people from being killed. He officially represented Germany and acted as senior chief of the European-U.S. establishment that remained in Nanjing, the Chinese capital at the time, when the city fell to the Japanese troops.

Early life 

Rabe was born in Hamburg on 23 November 1882.

Early career
Rabe pursued a career in business. He worked in Africa for several years.

In 1908, he left for China, and between 1910 and 1938 worked for the Siemens AG China Corporation in Shenyang, Beijing, Tianjin, Shanghai and later Nanjing. Rabe suffered from diabetes by the time he worked in Nanjing, requiring him to take regular doses of insulin. At the time of the Japanese attack on Nanjing, Rabe was a staunch Nazi and the party's local head, serving as a Deputy Group Leader in the Nazi Party.

Establishment of the Nanking Safety Zone 

Many Westerners were living in Nanjing, the Chinese capital city, until December 1937, with some conducting trade and others on missionary trips. As the Imperial Japanese Army approached Nanjing and initiated bombing raids on the city, all but 22 foreigners fled, with 15 American and European missionaries and businessmen forming part of the remaining group. As the Japanese Army advanced on Nanjing on 22 November 1937, Rabe, along with other foreign nationals, organized the International Committee for the Nanking Safety Zone and created the Nanking Safety Zone to provide Chinese refugees with food and shelter from the impending Japanese massacre. He explained his reasons as: "there is a question of morality here… I cannot bring myself for now to betray the trust these people have put in me, and it is touching to see how they believe in me". The zones were located in all of the foreign embassies and at Nanking University.

The committee was inspired by the establishment in November of a similar neutral zone in Shanghai which had protected approximately 450,000 civilians. Rabe was elected leader of the committee, in part because of his Nazi Party status and the German-Japanese bilateral Anti-Comintern Pact. The committee established the Nanking Safety Zone in the western quarter of the city. The Japanese government had agreed not to attack parts of the city that did not contain Chinese military forces and the members of the International Committee for the Nanking Safety Zone attempted to persuade the Chinese government to move all their troops out of the area. In this they were partly successful. On 1 December 1937, before fleeing the city, Nanjing Mayor Ma Chao-chun ordered all Chinese citizens remaining in Nanjing to move into the Safety Zone. When Nanjing fell on 13 December 1937, 500,000 non-combatants remained in the city. Rabe also opened up his properties to help 650 more refugees.

Nanking Massacre 

According to Rabe, the Nanking Massacre resulted in the deaths of 50,000 to 60,000 civilians. Rabe and his zone administrators tried frantically to stop the atrocities. Modern estimates of the death toll of the Nanking Massacre vary but some put the number of murdered civilians as high as 300,000. Rabe's appeals to the Japanese using his Nazi Party credentials often only delayed them but the delay allowed hundreds of thousands of refugees to escape. The documentary Nanking credited Rabe with saving the lives of 250,000 Chinese civilians; other sources suggest he saved 250,000 to 300,000. In his diary, Rabe documented Japanese atrocities committed during the assault on and occupation of the city.

In a series of lectures he gave in Germany after his return, Rabe would say that "We Europeans put the number [of civilian casualties] at about 50,000 to 60,000". Rabe was not the only person to record Japanese atrocities. By December 1937, after the defeat of the Chinese force, Japanese soldiers often went house-to-house in Nanjing, shooting any civilians they encountered. Additional evidence of these violent acts came from the diaries kept by some Japanese soldiers and by Japanese journalists appalled at what occurred.

Return to Germany 

On 28 February 1938, Rabe left Nanjing. He traveled first to Shanghai, returning to Berlin on 15 April 1938. He took with him a large number of source materials documenting Japanese atrocities in Nanjing. Rabe showed films and photographs of Japanese atrocities in lecture presentations in Berlin and wrote to Hitler, asking him to use his influence to persuade the Japanese to stop further violence. Rabe was detained and interrogated by the Gestapo; his letter was never delivered to Hitler. Due to the intervention of Siemens AG, Rabe was released. He was allowed to keep evidence of the massacre (excluding films) but not to lecture or write on the subject again. Rabe continued working for Siemens, which briefly posted him to the safety of Siemens AG in Afghanistan. Rabe subsequently worked in the company's Berlin headquarters until the end of the war.

Postwar 

After the war, Rabe was arrested first by the Soviet NKVD, then by the British Army. Both let him go after intense interrogation. He worked sporadically for Siemens, earning little. He was later denounced by an acquaintance for his Nazi Party membership, losing the work permit he had been given by the British Zone of Occupation. Rabe then had to undergo lengthy de-Nazification (his first attempt was rejected and he had to appeal) in the hope of regaining permission to work. He depleted his savings to pay for his legal defence.

Unable to work and with his savings spent, Rabe and his family survived in a one-room apartment by selling his Chinese art collection but it was insufficient to prevent their malnutrition. He was formally declared "de-Nazified" by the British on 3 June 1946 but continued to live in poverty. His family subsisted on wild seeds, his children eating soup and dry bread until running out of that as well. In 1948, Nanjing citizens learned of the Rabe family's dire circumstances and quickly raised a sum of money equivalent to $2,000 USD ($ in ). The city's mayor traveled to Germany via Switzerland, where he bought a large amount of food for the Rabe family. From mid-1948 until the communist takeover, the people of Nanjing also sent the family a food package each month, for which Rabe wrote many letters expressing deep gratitude.

Death and legacy 

On 5 January 1950, Rabe died of a stroke. In 1997, his tombstone was moved from Berlin to Nanjing, where it received a place of honour at the massacre memorial site and still stands today. In 2005, Rabe's former residence in Nanjing, the John Rabe House, was restored to its former state; it houses the John Rabe and International Safety Zone Memorial Hall, opened in 2006. The Austrian Service Abroad was later invited to send a Peace Servant there. Rabe's grave in Kaiser Wilhelm Memorial Cemetery in Berlin-Charlottenburg was re-erected in 2013.

War diaries 

Rabe's wartime diaries were published in English as The Good German of Nanking (UK title) or The Good Man of Nanking (US title) (original German title: Der gute Deutsche von Nanking).

Portrayals in film 

John Rabe has been portrayed in numerous films:
 In Mou Tun Fei's 1995 film Black Sun: The Nanking Massacre. Minnie Vautrin and George Ashmore Fitch are also depicted.
 In Wu Ziniu's 1995 film Don't Cry, Nanking, actor Ulrich Ottenburger played Rabe, although his name was changed to "John Robbins".
 In Bill Guttentag and Dan Sturman's 2007 documentary film Nanking, actor Jürgen Prochnow played Rabe.
 In Lu Chuan's 2009 film City of Life and Death, actor John Paisley played Rabe.
 In Florian Gallenberger's film John Rabe, also released in 2009, Ulrich Tukur played John Rabe.

See also 

 Robert Jacquinot de Besange, a French Jesuit who saved over half a million Chinese civilians.
 Minnie Vautrin, an American missionary who saved thousands of lives during the Nanking Massacre.
 Robert O. Wilson, an American physician who treated victims brought to the Nanking Safety Zone.
 John Magee, an American priest and missionary who documented the Nanking Massacre.
 Bernhard Arp Sindberg, a Danish worker who saved thousands of people by harbouring them in a factory during the Nanking Massacre.
 Georg Rosen, consular employee of the German Foreign Office who helped create the Nanking Safety Zone.

References

Sources 
 Erwin Wickert (editor). (1998). The Good German of Nanking: The Diaries of John Rabe, Knopf. 
 Original German: (1997). John Rabe. Der gute Deutsche von Nanking. Deutsche Verlags-Anstalt, Stuttgart.

External links 

 John Rabe Peace and Communication Center Heidelberg 
 
 Museum Recalls Hero of 'The Rape of Nanking' Fall 2006 NPR program about Rabe
 John Rabe's Nanjing Diaries | Testifying and Contesting War Experiences in China and Japan Research project: John Rabe's Nanking Diaries: Testifying and Contesting War Experiences in China and Japan

1882 births
1950 deaths
People assisting Chinese during the Nanjing Massacre
Nazi Party members
German humanitarians
German people of World War II
Businesspeople from Hamburg
German expatriates in China
Siemens people
Witnesses of the Nanjing Massacre
Germany–Japan relations
Fascism in Asia